Jörg Balke (23 March 1936 – 5 March 2012) was a German middle-distance runner. He competed in the men's 800 metres at the 1960 Summer Olympics.

References

1936 births
2012 deaths
Athletes (track and field) at the 1960 Summer Olympics
German male middle-distance runners
Olympic athletes of the United Team of Germany
Athletes from Berlin